Tephritis conflata is a species of tephritid or fruit flies in the genus Tephritis of the family Tephritidae.

Distribution
Kyrgyzstan.

References

Tephritinae
Insects described in 1995
Diptera of Asia